The Malayan Party (MP) was a political party in Malaysia.

History
The party was established by Tan Gee Gak on 24 October 1956 in Malacca with the support of the Federation of Chinese Guilds and Associations and the Malacca Chinese Chamber of Commerce (which Tan was president of). Its formation was a response to concerns over the Alliance Party's stance on the constitution being drafted, and the party was deliberately established on United Nations Day to represent its support for the Universal Declaration of Human Rights. It also supported Malacca's status as a crown colony, which allowed Chinese greater rights than the Malay states.

The party won seats in the 1956, 1957 and 1958 local elections in Malacca. Although it failed to win a seat in the 1959 state elections, in the 1959 general elections it won one seat in Parliament, Tan winning in Malacca City. However, the party disbanded in March 1964 when Tan rejoined the Malaysian Chinese Association (MCA), the party he had left to form the MP.

General election results

References

Defunct political parties in Malaysia
1956 establishments in Malaya
Political parties established in 1956
1964 disestablishments in Malaysia
Political parties disestablished in 1964